Hemosiderin hyperpigmentation is pigmentation due to deposits of hemosiderin, and occurs in purpura, haemochromatosis, hemorrhagic diseases, and stasis dermatitis.

See also 
 List of cutaneous conditions

References 

 

Disturbances of human pigmentation